The 2004–05 Israeli Premier League season saw Maccabi Haifa win their second consecutive title and ninth overall. It took place from the first match on 21 August 2004 to the final match on 28 May 2005.

Two teams from Liga Leumit were promoted at the end of the previous season: Hapoel Haifa and Hapoel Nazareth Illit. The two teams relegated were Maccabi Netanya and Maccabi Ahi Nazareth.

Teams and Locations

Twelve teams took part in the 2004-05 Israeli Premier League season, including ten teams from the 2003-04 season, as well as two teams which were promoted from the 2003-04 Liga Leumit.

Hapoel Haifa were promoted as champions of the 2003-04 Liga Leumit. Hapoel Nazareth Illit were promoted as runners up. Hapoel Haifa returned to the top flight after an absence of two seasons, while Hapoel Nazareth Illit made their debut in the top flight.

Maccabi Netanya and Maccabi Ahi Nazareth were relegated after finishing in the bottom two places in the 2003-04 season.

 The club played their home games at a neutral venue because their own ground did not meet Premier League requirements.

Final table

Results

First and second round

Third round

Top goal scorers

See also
2004–05 Toto Cup Al

 

Israeli Premier League seasons
Israel
1